The Armenian–Tatar massacres (also known as the Armenian-Tartar war, the Armeno-Tartar war) refers to the bloody inter-ethnic confrontation between Armenians and Caucasian Tatars (later known as Azerbaijanis) throughout the Russian Caucasus in 1905–1907. The massacres started during the Russian Revolution of 1905. The most violent clashes occurred in 1905 in February in Baku, in May in Nakhchivan, in August in Shusha and in November in Elizabethpol, heavily damaging the cities and the Baku oilfields. Some violence, although of lesser scale, broke out also in Tiflis.

The violence led to a sense of distrust and animosity that persisted for many years. This tension largely resulted from the larger political and social issues of the time, rather than any inherent conflict between the Armenian and Tatar peoples.

In Baku 

Svante Cornell, a Swedish scholar from Stockholm-based Institute for Security and Development Policy, Central Asia-Caucasus Institute & Silk Road Studies Program (CACI) and American Foreign Policy Council, in his "Small nations and great powers: a study of ethnopolitical conflict in the Caucasus" provides various sources that give conflicting accounts on the Baku events.

Sources such as British historian Christopher J. Walker (the author of Armenia: The Survival of a Nation, Italian historian Luigi Villari and Lebanese-Armenian historian Hratch Dasnabedian, have argued that the Azeris provoked the fighting, leading to a strong Armenian response. In Villari's view, Tatars had started the conflict by killing numerous unarmed Armenians in February 1905 causing a strong response in the Armenian community. Dasnabedian wrote that the Azeris, ‘free to massacre with impunity’, ‘unleashed a war against the Armenians, with a clear intention to massacre, pillage, and destroy, killing unarmed Armenians in February 1905 in Baku, and later moving to other cities including Karabakh', which resulted in a response from the Dashnaks who managed to ‘stop the original momentum of the armed and destructive Azeri mobs’ and even ‘counterattack and sometimes severely punish’ the Azeris. 

Georgian revolutionary Filip Makharadze, gives the number killed in Baku in February, 1905, as more than 1,000, most of whom were Armenians. 

On the other hand, Erich Feigl, an Austrian producer of Austrian-German-Turkish films and a denier of Armenian genocide has said that the Dashnaks committed terrorist acts (similar to those orchestrated in the Ottoman Empire) against the Azeri majority in Shusha, Baku and Ganja, leading to the eruption of violence and elimination of most of the Azerbaijani leading stratum in Baku. Charles van der Leeuw, a Baku-based Dutch correspondent known for stressing the need for insight to “the other side of the story”, claimed that the riots started with the killing of an Azeri schoolboy and a shopkeeper in Baku, followed by an Azeri mob's march on the Armenian quarters of Baku, and 126 Azeris and 218 Armenians killed within four days. According to the Baku Statistical Bureau, 205 Armenians and 111 Tatars were killed in the clashes, of which 9 were women, 20 were children, and 13 were elderly, along with 249 wounded.

In Nakhichevan and Shusha 

After the Baku clashes, Muslim communities in the Nakhchivan district began smuggling consignments of weapons from Persia. By April, murders of Armenians in the district began to assume alarming proportions and the Armenian community applied to the Russian authorities for protection. However, Luigi Villari describes the district's governor as "bitterly anti-Armenian" and the vice-governor in Yerevan as an "Armenophobe".

On 25 May, acting on a previously arranged plan, bands of armed Tatars attacked the market area in the town of Nakhchivan, looting and burning Armenian businesses and killing any Armenians they could find. Approximately 50 Armenians were murdered and some of the Armenian shopkeepers were burnt alive in their shops. On the same day, Tatar villagers from the countryside began attacking their Armenian neighbours. Villari cites official reports mentioning that "out of a total of 52 villages with Armenian or mixed Armenian-Tartar populations, 47 were attacked, and of that 47, 19 were completely destroyed and abandoned by their inhabitants. The total number of dead, including those in Nakchivan town, was 239. Later, in a revenge attack, Armenians attacked a Tartar village, killing 36 people".

The situation in Shusha was different than in Nakhchivan. According to the journalist Thomas de Waal, out of the 300 killed and wounded, about two-thirds were Tatars as the Armenians were better shooters and enjoyed the advantage of position.

In Ganja 
Prior to the Armenian-Tatar massacres, Ganja, known to Armenians as Gandzak (]) had a sizable Armenian population.

Analysis

The clashes were not confined to the towns; 128 Armenian and 158 Tatar villages were sacked and ruined. The total number of lives lost ranges is estimated between 3,100 to at least 10,000. Another 15,000 people were uprooted. Svante Cornell states that ARF members on the Armenian side were more effective and that the poor Tartar organization lead to more casualties on the Tatar side. However, the Armenians sustained more than 75% of the property damage. 

At the time of the clashes, the Armenians and Tatars were known for being proficient in each other's languages and mixing between the two communities was common. The destruction of each other's villages and the pogroms in Baku therefore resulted in grave distress both on a local as well as on a global level. 

According to historian Sen Hovhannisian, 4,000 people were wounded or killed as a result of the massacres. Moreover, 178 of 182 Armenian shops in Nakhichevan were looted and many Armenian villages were set on fire. Near Tiflis (present-day Tbilisi) on 23–25 November 1905, 500 Armenian volunteers protected the Armenian population consisting of 100,000 from "Tatar robbers".

According to Firuz Kazemzadeh, writing in 1951: "it is impossible to pin the blame for the massacres on either side. It seems that in some cases (Baku, Elizavetpol) the Azerbaijanis fired the first shots, in other cases (Shusha, Tiflis) the Armenians." During the massacres, the government, despite its sufficient strength, did not intervene. Viceroy Vorontsov-Dashkov himself said that government forces had done nothing to prevent the massacres.''

According to French writer Claude Anet, who in April 1905 crossed the Caucasus region by automobile, "the many minorities - and, in particular, Azeris (Tatars) and Armenians - resumed ancestral clashes". Anet wrote that the [Russian] government accused the Armenians of being the instigators but he believed the government was wrong. He explained that the Armenians, who formed the trading class, were not liked by the Muslim population or the Georgians for being non-Orthodox (they formed a separate Church whose Catholicos resided in Etchmiadzin, near Yerevan). He thought the government disliked the Armenians for being anti-government (the Armenians wanted a fair and strong political power for protection and therefore wanted the downfall of the autocratic and bureaucratic regime). Anet characterized the Armenians as "getting rich quickly at the expense of the populations in the midst of which they live and excelling in the money business like the Jews", and "using bombs for defence instead of hand-to-hand combat". He wrote that "for a long time Russian policy was made in the Caucasus against the Armenians" and that "Russian policy aroused the Tatars against the Armenians, who themselves were not suspected of intellectualism".

See also
 Armenia–Azerbaijan relations

References

Bibliography
 
 
 
 
 
 

Mass murder in 1905
Mass murder in 1906
Mass murder in 1907
1905 in the Russian Empire
1906 in the Russian Empire
1907 in the Russian Empire
1905 in Georgia (country)
1906 in Georgia (country)
1907 in Georgia (country)
Massacres in 1905 
Massacres in 1906 
Massacres in 1907 
Massacres in Armenia
Massacres in Azerbaijan
Massacres of Armenians
1905 in Armenia
1906 in Armenia
1907 in Armenia
1905 in Azerbaijan
1906 in Azerbaijan
1907 in Azerbaijan
Armenia–Azerbaijan relations
History of the Caucasus under the Russian Empire 
1905 murders in the Russian Empire
1906 murders in the Russian Empire
1907 murders in the Russian Empire